The Prisoner of Chillon is a 392-line narrative poem by Lord Byron.  Written in 1816, it chronicles the imprisonment of a Genevois monk, François Bonivard, from 1532 to 1536.

Writing and publication
On 22 June 1816, Lord Byron and his contemporary and friend Percy Bysshe Shelley were sailing on Lake Geneva (referred to as "Lac Leman", the French name, throughout the poem) and stopped to visit the Château de Chillon. After touring the castle (and walking through the dungeon in which Bonivard was imprisoned), Byron was inspired by Bonivard's story and composed The Sonnet of Chillon.

Because of torrential rainfall, Byron and his companion rested at a hotel in Ouchy following their tour. In late June or early July (several early drafts and copies present conflicting dates), Byron composed the longer fable. The work was probably completed by 2 July 1816. The Prisoner of Chillon was first published as The Prisoner of Chillon and Other Poems by John Murray on 5 December 1816.

Structure 

The work's themes and images follow those of a typical poem by Lord Byron: the protagonist is an isolated figure, and brings a strong will to bear against great sufferings.  He seeks solace in the beauty of nature (especially in sections ten and thirteen), and is a martyr of sorts to the cause of liberty.  Like much of Byron's work, it came about as a reaction to his own experiences as a traveller, making use of historical and geographical knowledge Byron gained in continental Europe.

Stylistically, it is a romantic verse-tale.

Concept

The poem describes the trials of a lone survivor of a family who have been martyred. The character's father was burnt at the stake, and out of six brothers, two fell at the battlefield while one was burnt to death. The remaining three were sent to the castle of Chillon as prisoners, out of which two more died due to pining away. In time only the narrator lived.

References

External links

 
 The Prisoner of Chillon, 1816 first edition.

Poetry by Lord Byron
1816 poems
John Murray (publishing house) books
1816 books